Fruitville is a census-designated place (CDP) in Sarasota County, Florida, United States. The population was 15,484 at the 2020 census. It is part of the North Port–Sarasota–Bradenton Metropolitan Statistical Area.

History

The area that is Fruitville was mostly a sawgrass swamp when European pioneers began to settle the area. This marshland was home to wild cattle but, according to one source, those cattle didn't do well due to a lack of minerals in the foliage they grazed from. This swampland was eventually drained to make the land more suitable for farming.  

In the late 1870s, a new wave of pioneers began to settle in Florida thanks to a growing orange industry. In 1876, a man by the name of Charles Reaves settled in what is now considered Fruitville. According to some sources, he was the one who named the area Fruitville after the abundance of fruit in the area. Reaves would go on to become the postmaster for the area's 115 residents. The first church in Sarasota County was the Friendship Baptist Church. The church was chartered in 1875 and a small pine log structure was used for the congregation until a new church was erected in 1876, using some of the original lumber from the first church. In 1887, the Florida Mortgage and Investment Company of Scotland donated land to the church for the establishment of the community's first cemetery.

Also in 1887, Charles and his wife Martha Tatum Reaves converted their corncrib into Fruitville's first school for their three children and seven neighbors. They went on to hire Miss Josie Clower as the first teacher in the area. After citizens petitioned for a modern school building, funding was granted from the Works Progress Administration to build Fruitville Elementary in 1941. Rural schools in the nearby villages of Tatum Ridge and Old Myakka were closed, with their students bussed to the new school in Fruitville.

A map from 1902 shows Fruitville on the map as a community.

In May 1918, Franklin Field (named after then-mayor George Franklin) began operating as a military airfield during . The Franklin airfield was located north of Fruitville Road and east of what is now Tuttle road. The airfield was an auxiliary landing station for the U.S. Army Air Service and housed, at the least, several Curtiss JN "Jenny" planes. With the war over, the airfield saw less and less traffic and was likely unused by 1920. In 1924 the land was developed for a new subdivision.

Throughout the 1960s and 70s, there was a migrant camp called Sababo in Fruitville that supplied much of the labor force for area's farm industry. A major crop in the area was celery. In 1966, there was an estimated 2,000 migrant workers in Sarasota County. To provide healthcare and education to this population, on December 5, 1966 the Fruitville Area Medical and Educational (FAME) Center was opened.

In November 1990, Litchfield's Cinema 10 opened in the Sarasota Commons, the community's first modern movie theater. As a promotion, the theater offered tickets for only 50 cents during its opening.

On December 8, 2001, the Fruitville Public Library was opened to serve the Fruitville community as a part of the Sarasota County Library System. The library was initially called East County Library throughout its land-use planning process before the Sarasota County Commission renamed the library a month prior to its opening.

Geography

Demographics
As of the 2020 United States Census, there was a population of 15,484 people and 6,043 households. There were 2.32 persons per household. 

In terms of age, 4% were under 5 years old, 15% were 18 years or younger, 45% were between 18 and 64, and %26 were 65 years or older. 91% of the population was white, 2.1% was black or African American, 2.4% was Asian, and 12.5% was Hispanic or Latino. There were 1,172 veterans living in Fruitville and 12.9% of the population was Foreign born. 

The median value of owner-occupied housing units was $275,600 and the median gross rent was $1,639. Median household income was $72,512. 7.6% of the population lived below the poverty threshold. 92.6% of households had a computer and 88.1% had a broadband internet subscription. 

Of the population 25 years and older, 91.0% had a high school degree or higher and 33.0% of that same population had a Bachelor's degree or higher. 

Of the population under 65 years old, 6.8% lived with a disability and 17.2% did not have health insurance.

Education
Fruitville is home to several public and private schools including:
Fruitville Elementary 
Julie Rohr Academy
Learning Academy of Sarasota 
McIntosh Middle School
Sarasota Academy of the Arts 
Sarasota Christian School

It is also home to the Fruitville Public Library, a branch of the Sarasota County Library System.

References

Census-designated places in Sarasota County, Florida
Sarasota metropolitan area
Census-designated places in Florida